Rachid Ziar (born 15 November 1973) is a retired Algerian long-distance runner who specialized in the marathon.

He finished 24th at the 1999 World Half Marathon Championships, 19th at the 2001 World Half Marathon Championships and 18th at the 2003 World Championships. He also competed at the 2004 Olympic Games, but did not finish the race.

His personal best times were 1:01:30 hours in the half marathon, achieved in September 1999 in Uijeongbu; and 2:09:54 hours in the marathon, achieved in April 2002 in the Paris Marathon.

Achievements

References

1973 births
Living people
Algerian male marathon runners
Algerian male long-distance runners
Athletes (track and field) at the 2004 Summer Olympics
Olympic athletes of Algeria
21st-century Algerian people
20th-century Algerian people